Game of Thrones is an American  fantasy drama television series created for HBO by David Benioff and D. B. Weiss. It is an adaptation of A Song of Ice and Fire, George R. R. Martin's series of fantasy novels. The story, set on the fictional continents of Westeros and Essos, has several plot lines and a large ensemble cast. The first story arc follows a dynastic conflict among competing claimants for succession to the Iron Throne of the Seven Kingdoms, with other noble families fighting for independence from the throne. The second covers attempts to reclaim the throne by the exiled last scion of the realm's deposed ruling dynasty; the third chronicles the threat of the impending winter and the legendary creatures and fierce peoples of the North.

The series, mostly written by Benioff and Weiss, has been nominated for many awards, including eight Golden Globe Awards (one win), ten Writers Guild of America Awards, eight Producers Guild of America Awards (one win), ten Directors Guild of America Awards (two wins), eight Art Directors Guild Awards (five wins), thirty-four Saturn Awards (six wins), fourteen Satellite Awards (three wins), and a Peabody Award (one win). The series has received 164 Primetime Emmy Award nominations, including eight consecutive Outstanding Drama Series nominations, with a total of 59 wins. Game of Thrones received numerous nominations, with awards recognizing various aspects of the series such as directing, writing, cast, visual effects, or overall quality.

Peter Dinklage is the most awarded and nominated member of the cast, with recognitions such as the Primetime Emmy Award and Golden Globe for Best Supporting Actor in a Series. He is also the only member of the cast to receive an Emmy. In addition, cast members Lena Headey, Emilia Clarke, Kit Harington, Maisie Williams, Nikolaj Coster-Waldau, Alfie Allen, Sophie Turner, Gwendoline Christie, Carice van Houten, Diana Rigg, and Max von Sydow received Primetime Emmy Award nominations for their performances in the series. The rest of the cast was also praised, many receiving various award nominations, including six Screen Actors Guild Award for Outstanding Performance by an Ensemble in a Drama Series nominations rewarding all of the main cast for seasons 1, 3, 4, 5, 6 and 7. In 2015, Game of Thrones set a record for winning the highest number of Primetime Emmy Awards for a series in a single year, with 12 wins out of 24 nominations. In 2016, it became the most awarded series in Emmy Awards history, with a total of 38 wins. To date, Game of Thrones has won 272 awards out of 757 nominations. The show also holds six world records from the Guinness Book of World Records, including "Most pirated TV program" and "Largest TV drama simulcast".

Total awards and nominations for the cast

Significant guild and peer awards 
Awards and nominations in this section are given by members of that specific profession's guild or trade union.

Emmy Awards

The Emmy Awards were established in 1949 in order to recognize excellence in the American television industry, and are bestowed by members of the Academy of Television Arts & Sciences. Emmy Awards are given in different ceremonies presented annually; Primetime Emmy Awards recognize outstanding work in American primetime television programming, while the Creative Arts Emmy Awards are presented to honor technical and creative achievements, and include categories recognizing work of art directors, lighting and costume designers, cinematographers, casting directors, and other production-based personnel. The Emmy Award corresponds to the Academy Award (for film), the Tony Award (for theatre), and the Grammy Award (for music).

Game of Thrones has won 59 out of 160 nominations. Peter Dinklage has been nominated for Outstanding Supporting Actor in a Drama Series eight times for playing Tyrion Lannister, with wins in 2011, 2015, 2018 and 2019, making him the only Game of Thrones actor to receive a Primetime Emmy and the only actor to receive a nomination for each season. Showrunners David Benioff and D. B. Weiss have won twice for Writing for a Drama Series. Game of Thrones has eight nominations for Outstanding Drama Series, winning four, in 2015, 2016, 2018 and 2019. Both David Nutter and Miguel Sapochnik have won for Outstanding Directing for a Drama Series. Game of Thrones holds the Emmy Award record for most wins for a scripted television series, ahead of Frasier (which received 37).

At the 67th Primetime Emmy Awards the show's fifth season was nominated for 24 awards. The show ultimately won 12 awards, setting a new record for most Emmy wins by a series in a single year, replacing the previous holder The West Wings nine wins, and tying that show and Hill Street Blues for the most wins by a drama series throughout its run. At the nominee announcement for the 68th Primetime Emmy Awards, the show's sixth season received the most nominations of any show with 23. The show again won 12 awards, tying the same record for most Emmy wins by a series in a single year.

At the 70th Primetime Emmy Awards the seventh season was nominated for 22 awards, the most of the ceremony, including a first Emmy nomination for Nikolaj Coster-Waldau. At the 71st Primetime Emmy Awards the eighth season was nominated for 32 awards, thus breaking the record for most nominations received by a regular series in a single year. Actors Alfie Allen, Gwendoline Christie, Sophie Turner and Carice van Houten all received their first Emmy Award nomination thanks to this season.
Peter Dinklage received his eighth Primetime Emmy nomination and became the only cast member of the series to receive a nomination for each season.

Emmy awards and nominations for the cast

Primetime and Creative Arts Emmy Awards

Significant critical awards

Other awards

Notes

References

External links
 

Game of Thrones
Lists of awards by television series
Warner Bros. Discovery-related lists